Wing Commander Peter Ingram Padget LDS (born 4 April 1919) of Weston-super-Mare, Somerset, was a Royal Air Force officer and philatelist who was a specialist in the stamps of China. He wrote extensive on the subject and his articles appeared in Gibbons Stamp Monthly, the China Clipper, the Journal of Chinese Philately and The London Philatelist.

His collection of Wei Hai Wei (Shantung China) was sold by John Bull Auctions in 1990.

Selected publications
The postal stationery of the People's Republic of China, 1949-65. Batley, Yorkshire: Harry Hayes, 1975. (Originally published in serial form in the Journal of Chinese Philately.)
The postal markings of China. London: China Philatelic Society of London, 1978.
The revenue stamps of communist China: 1929-1955. 3rd edition. London: P.I. Padget, 1986.

References

1919 births
British philatelists
Year of death missing
Royal Air Force officers
Philately of China